Peter Womersley (24 June 1923 – 1993) was a British architect, best known for his work in the modernist style. He lived in the Scottish Borders, where a number of his buildings are located, although he worked on projects throughout the UK. Influenced principally by the work of Frank Lloyd Wright, and by the American Case Study Houses, Womersley's buildings employ such typical modernist elements as in-situ concrete and strong geometric forms, although he introduced a wider palette of materials than was typically used by Le Corbusier and his followers.

Biography
Womersley was originally intending to study law at Cambridge University, but was called up for service in the Second World War. He saw little action, however, and from 1946 to 1951 he studied architecture at the Architectural Association in London. He spent time in Kuwait, where he assisted in the design of a palace for a sheikh.

In 1952 he was admitted to the Royal Institute of British Architects (RIBA). His first commission was a house for his brother, John Womersley, at Farnley Tyas near Huddersfield. This house, known as Farnley Hey, won the RIBA bronze medal in 1958, and has been described as "one of the best demonstrations of the influence of Frank Lloyd Wright in Britain." The house is located in woodland, at the edge of a steep valley, and features pale lilac-coloured brickwork, extensive glazing, and timber boarding. Although designed in 1952, construction only began in 1954 after planning rules were changed. Womersley designed an extension in 1956.

Womersley then moved to the Scottish Borders, where he built The Rig, his home and studio in Gattonside near Melrose, in 1957. The same year, he worked on a house for the textile artist Bernat Klein near Selkirk. This house, High Sunderland, was also located in dense woodland, within the parks of the 19th-century Sunderland Hall, and was decorated internally with fabrics of Klein's own designs. The modular design has been described as a forerunner to Benjamin's Mount (1967), a house by Ernő Goldfinger. Womersley continued to concentrate on private houses, but obtained relatively few commissions. However, his practice began to take off in 1961 when he won the competition to design the Roxburgh County Offices (now the headquarters of Scottish Borders Council), and also gained a commission for a sports centre at the University of Hull. His practice remained small, with no more than five employees, but Womersley produced a number of notable buildings until the late 1970s.

The Nuffield Transplantation Surgery Unit (1963) at Edinburgh's Western General Hospital was "the first experimental building specifically designed for the transplantation of human organs." Other healthcare projects included an admissions unit for Haddington District Asylum (1963), now the Garlton Unit of Herdmanflat Hospital, and a GP's practice in Kelso. Collaborating with engineers Ove Arup, he designed a stadium for Gala Fairydean F.C. (1963), incorporating cantilevered structures of board-marked concrete to create the effect of a floating canopy. In 1969 he designed a studio for Bernat Klein, adjacent to High Sunderland. Strongly reminiscent of Frank Lloyd Wright's Fallingwater, the studio remains Womersley's best-known building, and was nominated as one of Scotland's 100 "Treasured Places" in 2008. The same year he was commissioned to design an extension to Edinburgh College of Art, but his highly articulated proposals were rejected. Later designs include the "sculptural" boiler house at the former Melrose District Asylum, and Monklands Leisure Centre in Coatbridge (both 1977).

High Sunderland, the Bernat Klein Studio and Gala Fairydean Stadium are now protected as Category A listed buildings, the highest level of protection for a building in Scotland of "special architectural or historic interest". In addition, The Rig and the Garlton Unit in Haddington were listed at Category B in 2007. In England, Farnley Hey is listed at Grade II by English Heritage.

Significant works

References

External links

Renovation of the Bernat Klein Studio, by Studio DuB Architects

20th-century Scottish architects
People associated with the Scottish Borders
1923 births
1993 deaths
British military personnel of World War II
Alumni of the Architectural Association School of Architecture
British expatriates in Kuwait